Priapulus is a genus of worms belonging to the family Priapulidae.

The genus has cosmopolitan distribution.

Species:

Priapulus abyssorum 
Priapulus caudatus 
Priapulus tuberculatospinosus

References

Priapulida